Carutapera is the northernmost city in the Brazilian state of Maranhão.

History 
In 1861, Firmino Pantoja and his wife, Augusta Pantoja, acquiring land from Manoel Rodrigues Leite Chaves, on the right bank of the Arapiranga River, founded the village that was called Carutapera. The toponym, of Tupi origin, means abandoned village.
The population progressed rapidly. In 1886, it was elevated to the category of village later extinct and its territory annexed to the municipality of Turiaçu. In 1935, the autonomy of Carutapera was re-established[²].

Subdivisions 
Sede

Where the largest urban concentration is found, it is called the headquarters, which is formed by twelve different neighborhoods:

 Amim Quemel
 Aparecida
 Boa Esperança
 Bom Jesus
 Centro
 Perpétuo Socorro
 Santo Antônio
 Santa Luzia
 Santa Rita
 São Benedito
 São José
 Substação

Interior
The Interior is composed of the rural area, with small and large villages.
  
 Arapiranga
 Bajaco
 Caju
 Canadá
 Cana Verde
 Cearazinho
 Estiva
 Europa 
 Forquilha
 Iraque
 Salvamento
 Manaus da Beira
 Parada Fortaleza
 Pindoval
 São Lourenço 
 Timbotiua

Tourism 

 Basilica of San Sebastian
 Apolônio River
 Seu Domingos River 
 São Pedro Beach

Feast of Saint Sebastian
The feast of Saint Sebastian is an annual devotion, held by the parish of Saint Sebastian.

References 

Populated places established in 1935
Populated coastal places in Maranhão
Municipalities in Maranhão